Chow Kwong Wing (born 17 March 1986) is a Hong Kong rower. He competed in the men's lightweight double sculls event at the 2008 Summer Olympics.

References

External links
 

1986 births
Living people
Hong Kong male rowers
Olympic rowers of Hong Kong
Rowers at the 2008 Summer Olympics
Asian Games medalists in rowing
Rowers at the 2006 Asian Games
Rowers at the 2010 Asian Games
Rowers at the 2014 Asian Games
Asian Games silver medalists for Hong Kong
Medalists at the 2010 Asian Games
Medalists at the 2014 Asian Games
21st-century Hong Kong people